The Middleboro Secondary (also called Middleborough Secondary and Middleboro Subdivision) is a railroad line owned by MassDOT in the U.S. state of Massachusetts. The line runs from Attleboro to Middleborough via Taunton.

Route
The line diverges from Amtrak's Northeast Corridor just north of Attleboro station. From there, it runs east through Norton then southeast through downtown Taunton. At Cotley Junction (near Weir Village), it separates from the New Bedford Subdivision and turns east. The line ends with a wye to the MBTA Commuter Rail Middleborough/Lakeville Line just south of downtown Middleborough.

History

The current Middleborough Subdivision is formed from sections of four different railroads built in the 19th century. The oldest section is from northwestern Taunton into downtown Taunton, opened in April 1836 as part of the Mansfield-Taunton Taunton Branch Railroad - one of the first railroad lines in New England. The New Bedford and Taunton Railroad completed an extension from Taunton south to New Bedford in 1840, including the current Middleboro Subdivision southeast of downtown Taunton. The Middleboro and Taunton Railroad opened a line from southeastern Taunton east to Middleborough in July 1856. In August 1871, the New Bedford and Taunton Railroad built a branch from Attleboro Junction in northwest Taunton to Attleboro.

The Old Colony acquired the Middleborough and Taunton Railroad in 1874. The same year, the New Bedford and Taunton Railroad became the New Bedford Railroad. It joined the Boston, Clinton, Fitchburg and New Bedford Railroad in 1876. The Old Colony acquired that system in 1879, and was itself merged into the New York, New Haven and Hartford Railroad in 1893. Year-round New York–Cape Cod and Boston–Fall River/New Bedford passenger service ended in 1958, and local service on the Attleboro–Taunton and Cotley Junction–Middleborough segments somewhat before then. However, summer-only trains from New York to Hyannis used the line from Attleboro to Middleborough from 1960 to 1964, as did Boston–Hyannis service on the Taunton–Middleborough section briefly in 1961.

The New Haven Railroad folded into Penn Central in 1969, and the line became part of Conrail in 1976. The station purchased the line from Conrail, along with several other branch lines in Southeastern Massachusetts, for $1.2 million in December 1982. Freight service on the line was assigned to CSX in the 1999 breakup of Conrail.

Portions of the Middleborough Secondary are planned for passenger use as part of the South Coast Rail project. Phase 1 in 2023 will run along the line from Pilgrim Junction to Cotley Junction, extending Middleborough/Lakeville Line commuter service to Fall River and New Bedford. A new Middleborough station will be constructed on the east end of the line. The MBTA issued a $403.5 million contract for the Middleborough Secondary and New Bedford Main Line portions of the project on August 24, 2020; construction was expected to begin later in 2020 and take 37 months. The work will upgrade Middleborough Secondary tracks for passenger service and construct the new Middleborough station. Phase 2, planned for 2030, will extend passenger service from the Providence/Stoughton Line to New Bedford and Fall River, and will involve the construction of new track connecting Stoughton to the Dighton and Somerset Railroad; trains will run along this new track, down the Dighton and Somerset Railroad, and then along the Middleborough Secondary from Weir Junction to Cotley Junction. When Phase 2 is completed, the connection from Middleborough to New Bedford and Fall River will be eliminated, and Middleborough/Lakeville Line will terminate at Pilgrim Junction; the section of the Middleborough Secondary east of Cotley Junction will return to being used only for freight service.

See also
 List of CSX Transportation lines

References

External links

CSX Transportation lines
Rail infrastructure in Massachusetts
Old Colony Railroad lines